Tonnerre (English: Thunder) is a French word meaning "thunder". It may refer to:

Places

Canada
Rivière-au-Tonnerre, Quebec, a municipality of the Minganie Regional County Municipality
Tonnerre River (Normandin River), a tributary of the Normandin River
Tonnerre River (Minganie), a tributary of the Gulf of Saint Lawrence

France
Mont-Tonnerre, former French department
Tonnerre, Yonne, French commune of Yonne

Other uses
Tonnerre (film), a 2013 French film
Boisrond-Tonnerre (1776–1806), Haitian writer and historian
French ship Tonnerre (L9014), an amphibious assault helicopter carrier of the French Navy

See also 
Lightning rod (French: paratonnerre), a device that protects a building or structure from lightning